José Carlos Prates Neves Fernandes (born 30 October 1995) is a Portuguese cyclist, who last rode for UCI Continental team .

On 4 October 2022, he received a three-year ban by the UCI for doping.

Major results

2014
 2nd Time trial, National Under-23 Road Championships
2015
 1st  Time trial, National Under-23 Road Championships
2017
 1st  Time trial, National Under-23 Road Championships
 1st  Overall Volta a Portugal do Futuro
1st Stage 2
 5th Overall Troféu Joaquim Agostinho
1st  Young rider classification
2018
 1st  Overall Troféu Joaquim Agostinho
1st  Young rider classification
 4th Time trial, National Road Championships
2019
 2nd Overall Troféu Joaquim Agostinho
1st  Young rider classification
1st Stage 3
 2nd Overall Tour of China II
 4th Time trial, National Road Championships
2021
 National Road Championships
1st  Road race
3rd Time trial
 2nd Overall Volta ao Alentejo
 2nd Overall Troféu Joaquim Agostinho
1st Stage 3
2022
 3rd Overall Volta ao Alentejo
 4th Time trial, National Road Championships

See also
Doping in sport
List of doping cases in cycling

References

External links

1995 births
Living people
People from Santarém, Portugal
Portuguese male cyclists
Sportspeople from Santarém District
Doping cases in cycling